Luangpho Ajahn Tala Uttama (alternatively spelt Luongphaw Ajar Tala Uttama, March 1910 in Mawkanin, Myanmar – 18 October 2006 in Bangkok, Thailand), was a Mon Buddhist monk. He was originally a Burmese citizen and later fled to Thailand and became one of Thailand's most admired and revered persons.

Biography
Luangpho Uttama was born in Mawkanin, Ye township in British Burma (now part of Tanintharyi Region in southern Myanmar). He fled to Thailand in 1948, avoiding abuse during the civil war in Burma. He later lived in the area of Wengka, located near the Burmese-Thailand border, and settled in Thailand.During 1943 he was invited by Luang Pu Waen Suciṇṇo for sharing vipassana meditation experience to his disciple. At 1947 invited by Luang Phor Fan (หลวงปู่ฝั้น อาจาโร) to teaching wicca and Nat (spirit) in Thailand

He was known and revered by civilians of Burmese and Thai for his profound and intensive Buddhist teachings and industrious meditation. He founded Wat Wang Wiwekaram in Sangkhlaburi, Thailand and gave shelter to Mon refugees who fled from Burma. In 1997, he paid a formal visit to Myanmar, visited Yangon (Rangoon), and was honoured with the title of Agga Maha Pandita by Khin Nyunt, then Burmese prime minister.

His prosperity integrated in Thailand reaching to the regards of the Royal Thai family. Luangphor Uttama invented the Bodh Gaya Pagoda, a pagoda shaped the same as Mahabodhi Temple with name Wat Wang Wiwekaram in 1978. It was a replica from India. The pagoda was made from concrete with the square iron, 42 meters long 49 meters high and an iron pole 4 directions in total 16. In 1989, Crown Prince Maha Vajiralongkorn attended auspiciously on occasion of invitation relics in Sri Lanka with 600 gm gold umbrella decorated on the top of pagoda.

Lastly, he was hospitalised by the patronage of Her Majesty Queen Sirikit and was paid a tribute on his funeral by the then premier of Thailand, General Surayud Chulanont.

See also
Sangkhlaburi, Kanchanaburi, Thailand
Mon people
Mon refugees

References
The Nation, 30016576.php
Kaowao News Group, 
The Independent Mon News Agency,

External links
Thai Monarch, 

1910 births
2006 deaths
People from Mon State
Burmese Buddhist monks
Thai Theravada Buddhist monks
Thai people of Mon descent
Theravada Buddhist monks
Burmese people of Mon descent
20th-century Buddhist monks